3-Hydroxyacyl ACP dehydrase is an enzyme involved in fatty acid synthesis.

External links

References